Gravitcornutia basiceramea is a species of moth of the family Tortricidae. It is found in Bahia, Brazil.

The wingspan is 12 mm. The basal half of the wings is brownish yellow with a few browner dots and brown suffusion of the base of the costa. The median area is brown and the distal third is ochreous brownish with brown strigulae (fine streaks). The hindwings are brown.

Etymology
The species name refers to the colouration of the forewing base and is derived from Greek ceramea or keramos (meaning [colour of] brick or clay).

References

Moths described in 2010
Gravitcornutia
Moths of South America
Taxa named by Józef Razowski